LQP may refer to:

 Letter-quality printer, a form of computer impact printer
 LQP, the station code for Liaquat Pur railway station, Rahim Yar Khan, Pakistan